Red Bear may refer to:

A Red Bear (film), an Argentine, Spanish and French film
Himalayan brown bear, also known as the Himalayan red bear